In Major League Baseball history, 65 teams have become defunct. These teams played in five different Major Leagues–the extant National League and the now defunct American Association, Union Association, Players' League and Federal League. Thirteen men who managed now-defunct Major League Baseball teams have been inducted into the Baseball Hall of Fame: Ned Hanlon, John McGraw, Jim O'Rourke, Pud Galvin, Fred Clarke, George Wright, John Montgomery Ward, Harry Wright, Charles Comiskey, Buck Ewing, Joe Tinker, Bill McKechnie and Mordecai Brown. Hanlon managed the National League Baltimore Orioles to three league championships. Eleven other managers managed now defunct teams to a single league championship: Bill Watkins, George Wright and Frank Bancroft in the National League, Arthur Irwin, Jack Chapman, Jim Mutrie and Lon Knight in the American Association, Fred Dunlap in the Union Association, King Kelly in the Players' League and Joe Tinker and Bill Phillips in the Federal League.

Patsy Tebeau's 579 wins with the National League Cleveland Spiders is more than any other manager won with any single defunct Major League Baseball team. His 1040 games managed and 436 losses with the Spiders are the most of any manager of a single defunct National League team. Billy Barnie's 1050 games managed and 548 losses with the American Association Baltimore Orioles are the most of any manager with a single defunct Major League team, and his 470 wins are the most of any manager of a defunct American Association team. Dunlap has the most managerial wins for a Union Association team, and King Kelly has the most wins for a Players' League team.  Tinker has the most wins for a Federal League manager, and Otto Knabe has the most losses.

Chapman and Bancroft each managed six different now defunct Major League Baseball teams. Chapman managed the National League Louisville Grays, Milwaukee Grays, Worcester Ruby Legs, Detroit Wolverines and Buffalo Bisons, and the Louisville Colonels in both the American Association and the National League. He managed the Colonels to the 1890 American Association championship, and to a tie with the National League champion Brooklyn Bridegrooms in the 1890 World Series. Bancroft managed the National League Worcester Ruby Legs, Detroit Wolverines, Cleveland Blues, Providence Grays and Indianapolis Hoosiers and the American Association Philadelphia Athletics. He managed the Providence Grays to the 1884 National League and World Series championships.

Table key

Managers

National League

American Association

Union Association

Players' League

Federal League

Footnotes 
 Team played as the Buffalo Buffeds in 1914.
 Team played as the Chicago Chi-Feds in 1914.
 Team played as the Cleveland Blues during its time in the American Association in 1887 and 1888.
 Team played as the Louisville Eclipse from 1882 through 1884.
 Team played as the Indianapolis Hoosiers in 1914.
 Team played as the Washington Statesmen during its time in the American Association in 1891.
 Ted Sullivan was the Union Association pennant winning Maroons' first manager in 1884, but was replaced by Fred Dunlap after leading the Maroons to 28 wins and 3 losses.  Since Dunlap finished the season as the Maroons' manager, he is shown as having won the league championship as manager that season.
 Fred Dunlap managed the St. Louis Maroons in both the Union Association and the National League.  His combined record for the Maroons was 155 games managed with 96 wins and 56 losses for a winning percentage of .632.  He led the Maroons to one league championship, in the Union Association in 1884.
 Tom Loftus managed the Cleveland Spiders (known as the Cleveland Blues in 1888) in both the American Association and the National League.  His combined record for the Blues/Spiders was 207 games managed with 91 wins and 110 losses for a winning percentage of .453.
 Jack Chapman managed the Louisville Colonels in both the American Association and the National League.  His combined record for the Colonels was 336 games managed with 164 wins and 166 losses for a winning percentage of .497.  He led the Colonels to one league championship, in the American Association in 1890.  The Colonels played to a tie against the National League champion Brooklyn Bridegrooms in the 1890 World Series.

References 

-